Taruca Sayana (possibly from Quechua taruka, luychu deer, sayana stop, whereabouts, a place where you stop frequently, "deer stop") is a mountain in the Vilcanota mountain range in the Andes of Peru, about  high. It is located in the Puno Region, Carabaya Province, on the border of the districts Corani and Ollachea. Taruca Sayana lies southeast of the mountains Llusca Ritti (Cusco-Puno) and Jori Pintay, south of the mountain Ananta Cucho, and northwest of the mountains Llusca Ritti (of Corani) and Quello Sallayoc.

References

Mountains of Peru
Mountains of Puno Region